Carminibotys is a genus of moths of the family Crambidae. It contains only one species, Carminibotys carminalis, which is found in Russia, China and Japan.

Species
Carminibotys carminalis carminalis (China)
Carminibotys carminalis iwawakisana Munroe & Mutuura, 1971 (Japan)

References

Pyraustinae
Crambidae genera
Taxa named by Eugene G. Munroe